Hazel Chu (born 3 November 1980) is an Irish Green Party politician who has been a member of Dublin City Council since May 2019. She was elected Cathaoirleach (Chairperson) of the Irish Green Party in December 2019, and was succeeded by Senator Pauline O'Reilly in December 2021. She was the first Irish-born person of Chinese descent elected to political office on the island of Ireland. She served as Lord Mayor of Dublin from 2020 to 2021, and in doing so became the first person of Chinese ethnicity to be mayor of a European capital.

Family
Chu's parents, Stella Choi Yau-fan and David Chu Tak-Leung, from villages in the New Territories of Hong Kong, both immigrated, individually, to Ireland in the 1970s. They met while working in the kitchen of a restaurant in Dublin and subsequently married, launching a takeaway chip van and other enterprises. Hazel Chu Chung-fai was born at the Rotunda Hospital in Dublin in November 1980. She was raised initially in the suburb of Firhouse, South Dublin, where up to 9 members of the extended family shared a 3-bedroom house, and, from age 6, lived in Celbridge, County Kildare. A brother, Joseph, was born when Chu was about 10. After her parents divorced, her mother established four restaurants, while her father returned to his home village to run a café there.

Education
Chu attended a local primary school, and for secondary school boarding in Rathdown School in Glenageary, followed by Mount Sackville School in Chapelizod. Chu has explained the boarding school as an example of how language barriers are issues for migrants - her parents didn't read English and she had to translate any letter that came from school them; the letter informing Chu's parents that they needed to apply for the local secondary school was missed and she couldn't attend since the deadline for applications passed before the error was discovered. Her parents later took out a loan to send her to a boarding school.

Chu studied Politics and History at University College, Dublin (UCD) and graduated with a BA 2002. She was active in college debating and was Auditor (Chairperson) of the Politics Society. She then completed a legal diploma and barrister-at-law degree at the King's Inns, and in 2007 she became the first Irish-born person of Chinese descent to be called to the Irish Bar.  She went on to complete a MSc in Marketing Practice in University College, Dublin 2011.

Professional career
After graduating from the King's Inns, Chu did not practice as a barrister, but worked as a fundraising manager for St Michael's House and an artist and production manager for Electric Picnic. She spent six months travelling and working in Australia and New Zealand, and part of a year as a volunteer teacher in a remote village in China, near Guilin, in 2009.  In 2010 she secured a fellowship as a marketing consultant in New York for Bord Bia. She returned to Ireland in 2012 and worked for Forfás and in the Office of the Chief Scientific Advisor, before working for the NDRC, and then Diageo Ireland, where she headed communications for five-and-a-half years.

Political career

Green Party
Chu managed the campaign for her partner Patrick Costello's successful election at the 2014 Dublin City Council election, in which he topped the poll in the Rathgar–Rathmines local electoral area (LEA) as a Green Party candidate. Chu became a member of the Green Party in 2016 and was subsequently elected to serve on the party's National Executive for three years running. In 2017, with Catherine Martin, Grace O'Sullivan and others she founded Mná Glasa, the party's woman group, and became its co-chair. She was elected National Coordinator of the Green Party and became its Spokesperson for Enterprise in 2018.

Dublin City councillor
Chu stood as a Green Party candidate in the Pembroke LEA in the 2019 Dublin City Council election. She was the first candidate in the country to be declared elected. She topped the poll, receiving a historic 33.1% of the first preference vote. Later that same year she was elected as Chairperson of the Green Party, beating Pauline O’Reilly of Galway West.

Lord Mayor of Dublin
On 29 June 2020, Chu was elected the 352nd Lord Mayor of Dublin, succeeding interim mayor Tom Brabazon. Chu is the first person of colour to hold the role, and the first ethnic Chinese mayor of a major European capital.

By-elections 
On 22 March 2021, Chu announced her candidacy as an independent for a Seanad Éireann by-election; Chu received the signatures of six of twelve Green Party TDs as part of this nomination, including deputy leader Catherine Martin, with six Green TDs and another four senators opposing her candidacy.  Ten days prior, the Green Party executive council, and the majority of Green TDs and Senators, had agreed to not run candidates for the election, leaving each of the larger two government parties, Fine Gael and Fianna Fáil, to run one candidate each, in line with an informal agreement. As a result, Chu's party leader indicated that he would not vote for her, and further that her role as chairperson of the party might be discussed internally. During a parliamentary party meeting on 24 March, a motion of no confidence was tabled against Chu by senators Pippa Hackett, Pauline O'Reilly and Róisín Garvey. During the meeting, Eamon Ryan is reported to have confirmed the absence of a formal pact to support the candidates of the other coalition parties, which was contradicted by O'Reilly, saying "If you call a spade a spade, we're in Government, that's a pact". Chu was not successful at the by-election, receiving 10 first preference votes (4.9%).

On 27 April 2021, on the resignation of Eoghan Murphy from his Dáil Éireann seat in Dublin Bay South, after consulting with party leadership Chu announced she would participate in the Green Party selection convention for the party nomination, competing with Dublin City councillor Claire Byrne; Chu did not receive this nomination, with Byrne selected by local party members to compete in the election.

She was an unsuccessful candidate in the 2022 Dublin University by-election.

Personal life
Chu resides in Dublin. She met her husband, Patrick Costello, before her UCD studies, and they have been together since her time at King's Inns. Costello is now a TD, and they have one daughter. They married in June 2021. Chu speaks Cantonese fluently, and some Mandarin.

Harassment
Chu has spoken of racism, bullying, and harassment while growing up. Subsequent to her election to the council and the media attention around it, Chu became a target of racist online harassment, particularly on Twitter. Some of her harassers targeted her skin colour but others labelled her a migrant and denied that she could be an Irish national. Further, some claimed that she was a product of the so-called "great replacement", a conspiracy theory propagated by the alt-right. The harassment later escalated to phone calls to her home. Justin Barrett, leader of the far-right fringe group the National Party, publicly indicated that if he ever got into power, he would attempt to strip Chu of her citizenship, despite her Irish birth. Chu stated her resolution to not be intimidated by the harassment and to continue with her political career.

In January 2021 Chu described having been racially abused by a group of far-right protestors who had gathered outside the Mansion House, the official residence of the Lord Mayor.

Notes

References

Living people

1980 births
Irish people of Hong Kong descent

Alumni of University College Dublin
Alumni of King's Inns
Politicians from Dublin (city)
21st-century Irish women politicians
Green Party (Ireland) politicians
Lord Mayors of Dublin